Sadashiv Vasantrao Gorakshkar (31 May 1933 – 13 July 2019) was an Indian writer, art critic, historian, museologist and a director of the Chhatrapati Shivaji Maharaj Vastu Sangrahalaya, erstwhile Prince of Wales Museum, Mumbai. He is credited with the restoration of Lakshmibai Pitre Kalasangrahalaya, a museum in Devrukh, Maharashtra to its present state.

Birth 
He was born on 31 May 1933 and brought up in the Indian state of Maharashtra.

Works 
Gorakshkar was the author of several books and articles such as:
 Raj Bhavans in Maharashtra
 Animal in Indian Art
 The Maritime Heritage of India
 Karle Caves of Western India.

Awards
Gorakshkar was honoured by the Government of India in 2003 with Padma Shri, the fourth highest Indian civilian award.

Death
He died on 13 July 2019 in Maharashtra and last rites were conducted in Vasind.

See also
 Prince of Wales Museum

References

Further reading

External links
 
 
 

Recipients of the Padma Shri in arts
1933 births
Scientists from Maharashtra
Indian male writers
Indian art critics
Indian art historians
Indian museologists
2019 deaths
20th-century Indian historians
Historians of Indian art